Michael Burke, 10th Earl of Clanricarde (1686–1726), styled Lord Dunkellin until 1722, was an Irish peer who was Governor of Galway (1712) and a Privy Counsellor in Ireland (1726).

Career
He was the son of John Burke, 9th Earl of Clanricarde and educated at Eton College and Christ Church, Oxford. He was appointed Governor of Galway in 1712 and invested as a Privy Counsellor in Ireland on 15 July 1726.

On his death he was buried in Christchurch, Dublin.

Family
He married Anne, the daughter of Speaker John Smith and the widow of Hugh Parker, who after her death in 1732 was buried in the nave of Westminster Abbey. They had 2 sons and 2 daughters:
 John Smith de Burgh, 11th Earl of Clanricarde
 Lady Anne de Burgh (died 1794) who married Denis Daly
 Lady Mary Bourke who married George Jennings
 Hon. John Bourke (died 1719)

Arms

References

Further reading
 Portumna Castle and its Lords, Michael Mac Mahon, 1983.
 Burke:People and Places, Eamon Bourke, Dublin, 1995.
 From Warlords to Landlords:Political and Social Change in Galway 1540–1640, Bernadette Cunningham, in "Galway:History and Society", 1996.

Politicians from County Galway
Michael
People educated at Eton College
Alumni of Christ Church, Oxford
Members of the Privy Council of Ireland
1686 births
1726 deaths
Members of the Irish House of Lords
Earls of Clanricarde